Alain Gustave (born October 5, 1986) is a Haitian soccer player who currently plays for Sevilla FC Puerto Rico of the Puerto Rico Soccer League. He also plays for the Haiti national football team.

Career
Alain has spent all his professional career in Haiti in the Haitian League, winning the championship in 2007. Gustave has also played for AS Mirebalais and Victory Sportif Club. In April 2010, Gustave signed with the Puerto Rico Soccer League champions Bayamón FC. Gustave scored his first goal along with his first hat-trick for Bayamón FC
in a group match for the 2010 CFU Club Championship. In 2011 season, he signed with Sevilla FC Puerto Rico to play in Puerto Rico Soccer League and USL Pro. Alain made his debut in the opening match of both competitions, with a draw 2–2 against Club Atlético River Plate Puerto Rico.

International
Alain made his debut for the Haiti national football team on February 27 and scored his first international goal in a 2–1 win against Dominican Republic. He also played in two friendlies in 2008 against Guatemala and Trinidad and Tobago.

Honours
Haitian League (1) : 2007

References

1986 births
Living people
Haitian footballers
Haiti international footballers
Association football forwards
Expatriate footballers in Puerto Rico
Sevilla FC Puerto Rico players
Ligue Haïtienne players
USL Championship players
Victory SC players
Cavaly AS players
AS Mirebalais players
Haitian expatriate footballers
Haitian expatriate sportspeople in Puerto Rico
People from Cap-Haïtien